La Porchetta is an Australian and New Zealand restaurant franchise which has become one of the biggest Italian restaurant chains in those countries. There are about 38 outlets now in Australia and New Zealand which are owned by franchisees.

Founding and history

La Porchetta was established in 1985 by Rocco Pantaleo and Felice Nania, when they bought a run-down pizza parlour called La Porchetta in Rathdowne Street, Carlton. Their first franchise restaurant opened in the Melbourne suburb of Reservoir, Victoria in 1990. Since 1990, over 80 La Porchettas have opened across Australia, by 2017 around 40 outlets existed.

In August 2014, Retail Food Group, which owns franchise chains Crust Pizza, Gloria Jean's coffeehouses, Donut King, Michel's Patisserie and Brumby's Bakeries, announced it would purchase La Porchetta's franchising system for $16.3 million. Three months later, RFG pulled out of the deal.

See also

List of restaurants in Australia
List of restaurants in New Zealand

References

External links 
 

Restaurants established in 1985
Italian restaurants
Restaurant chains in Australia
Restaurant chains in New Zealand
Restaurant franchises
Italian-Australian culture
Italian-Australian culture in Melbourne
Italian-New Zealand culture
1985 establishments in Australia
Italian restaurants in Australia